A Separate Peace is a 1972 American drama film directed by Larry Peerce. It was adapted by John Knowles and Fred Segal (the brother of actor George Segal) from Knowles's best-selling novel of the same title. The film stars Parker Stevenson.

Plot summary
During the summer of 1942, the 16-year-old Gene Forrester attends The Devon School, a private boarding school in New Hampshire.  His roommate is Phineas (nicknamed "Finny"), a free-spirited and cheerful nonconformist who is loved by everyone he meets. Gene, an introvert, tries to stifle his growing jealousy but is unable to control his envy of Finny’s athletic skill; natural popularity; and, above all, innate goodness.

Unable to bear the knowledge that Finny is a better person, Gene apparently shakes a tree branch that Finny is standing on. Finny falls to the ground and breaks his leg, which permanently disables him. After the incident, Gene meets with Finny and attempts to confess but then realizes that Finny desperately needs the illusion of friendship and that he must boost his fallen friend’s self-confidence.

Finny returns for the winter semester: refuses to accept the wartime influences permeating Devon; and, though his own athletic career is finished, starts to train Gene for the Olympics. Finny is initially resistant to the fact that a war is raging around them until another student, "Leper" Lepelier, returns absent without leave and corroborates the horrible stories that are only now been corroborated by a first-person narrative.

Another student, the judiciously-minded Brinker Hadley, instigates an inquiry into Finny’s accident and convenes a kangaroo court of fellow students. During this hearing, Leper reveals the truth about what happened, as he had been looking up from under the tree in which Gene apparently shook the branch. Finny begins to cry and in his effort to escape the tribunal, he falls down the stairs and breaks the same leg.

The second disaster has a curious healing effect on both boys, and when Gene visits Finny in the infirmary, both are reconciled. Finny accepts the fact that Gene never meant to hurt him, and Gene reveals his belief that Finny would have been emotionally unfit for war anyway. During a second procedure on his leg, bone marrow enters Finny's bloodstream, travels to his heart, and kills him. The surgeon tells a shell-shocked Gene "there are risks, always risks," and the surviving boy realizes that part of him has died with his best friend.

Cast
John Heyl as Finny
Parker Stevenson as Gene
William Roerick as Mr. Patchwithers
Peter Brush as Leper
Victor Bevine as Brinker
Scott Bradbury as Chet
John E.A. Mackenzie as Bobby
Mark Trefethen as John
Frank Wilich Jr. as Quackenbush
Elizabeth B. Brewster as Mrs. Patchwithers
Edward Echols as Mr. Ludsbury
Don Schultz as Dr. Stanpole
Paul Sadler as Naval Officer

Reception
Vincent Canby of The New York Times wrote:

Film historian Leonard Maltin denounced the picture in his annual Movie and Video Guide: "This supposedly-sensitive story, from an overrated novel, is morbid enough to make anyone gag. The acting is incredibly amateurish, and the direction has no feeling at all for the period. A Total Bummer is more like it."

Steven H. Scheuer's Movies on TV guide said of the film: "Director Larry Peerce has fashioned a strangely arch, listless film...the '40s atmosphere is well done, but Peerce seems as afraid of closeness and commitment as his protagonists."  

The film received glowingly-positive reviews from William Wolf in Cue magazine, Wanda Hale in the New York Daily News and Rex Reed, who at the time was also writing for the Daily News.  Reed called it "one of the best films about youth ever made" and added, "I have seen the film three times, and I dare say I have more left in me."

References

External links

1972 films
1972 drama films
1970s coming-of-age drama films
American coming-of-age drama films
Films set in boarding schools
Films directed by Larry Peerce
Films based on American novels
Films scored by Charles Fox
Films set in 1942
Films set in New Hampshire
Films set in schools
Films set on the home front during World War II
Films shot in New Hampshire
Paramount Pictures films
Phillips Exeter Academy
1970s English-language films
1970s American films